Seth Shostak (born July 20, 1943) is an American astronomer and author, and is currently the senior astronomer for the SETI Institute.

Shostak hosts SETI's weekly radio show/podcast Big Picture Science, has played himself numerous times in TV and internet film dramas, and has acted in several science fiction films.

Early life and education
Seth Shostak was born in a Jewish family in Arlington, Virginia, the son of Arthur and Bertha Shostak (née Gortenburg); his father was an electrical engineer. He earned his BS in physics from Princeton University and a PhD in astrophysics from the California Institute of Technology.

Professional work
Shostak used radio telescopes in the US and the Netherlands, searching for clues to the ultimate fate of the universe by analyzing galaxy motion. In 1999, he produced twelve 30-minute lectures on audio-tape and video titled "The Search for Intelligent Life in Space" for The Teaching Company. An updated overview about the search for extraterrestrial life was presented in 2019.

SETI Institute
Since 2001, he has been the senior astronomer at the SETI Institute, a not-for-profit organization whose mission is to "explore, understand and explain the origin, nature and prevalence of life in the universe". SETI Institute, located in Mountain View, California, employs over 50 researchers that study all aspects of the search for life, its origins, the environment in which life develops, and its ultimate fate.

He was the chair of the International Academy of Astronautics SETI Permanent Committee from 2003-2012.

Public outreach

Shostak is an active participant in the Institute's observation programs and has been hosting SETI's weekly radio show Big Picture Science since 2002.  Each week, Shostak interviews guests about the latest scientific research on a variety of topics: cosmology, physics, genetics, paleontology, evolutionary biology and astrobiology. Big Picture Science is distributed on the Public Radio Satellite System and the Public Radio Exchange and is available for download at the SETI Institute's website and through podcasts.

Shostak also hosts the monthly "Skeptic Check" episodes of Big Picture Science, focused on debunking pseudoscience, UFOs and practices such as astrology and dowsing.

He has published four books, nearly 300 popular articles on astronomy, technology, film and television and gives frequent talks to both young and adult audiences.

Filmography

Television / web series

Recognition
Shostak was the 2004 winner of the Klumpke-Roberts Award of the Astronomical Society of the Pacific in recognition of his outstanding contributions to the public understanding and appreciation of astronomy.

In January 2010 he was elected as a fellow of the Committee for Skeptical Inquiry (CSI), and in October 2019 was a featured speaker at the organization's annual conference, CSICon.

He has been an observer for Project Phoenix (SETI) as well as an active participant in various international forums for SETI research. He served as chair of the International Academy of Astronautics SETI Permanent Study Group from 2002 to 2012.

Shostak has been nominated by the SETI Institute to be one of the USA Science and Engineering Festival's Nifty Fifty Speakers, who will speak about his work and career to middle and high school students in October 2010.

Personal life
Seth became interested in electronics and amateur radio as a young student.

Shostak's hobbies include film making, railroading, and computer animation. While working at the University of Groningen in the Netherlands, he founded DIGIMA, a computer animation company. He is a brother of Robert Shostak, developer of the Paradox relational database.

In the spring of 1988 Seth left Groningen to help his brother, who was then working on image database software in Silicon Valley.

According to his C.V., Shostak has a considerable body of creative writing, mostly for corporate clients. He was also "idea man" behind a plan to build a large space and technology theme park in The Netherlands and also the Air and Space Exhibit at the California Science Center, where he also serves on the board.

Bibliography
Life in the Universe, Jeffrey O. Bennett, Bruce Jakosky and Seth Shostak, 1980, .
Sharing the Universe: Perspectives on Extraterrestrial Life, Seth Shostak, foreword by Frank Drake 1998, .
Cosmic Company: The Search for Life in the Universe, Seth Shostak, Alex Barnett, 2003, .
Confessions of an Alien Hunter: A Scientist's Search for Extraterrestrial Intelligence, Seth Shostak, foreword by Frank Drake 2009, .

References

External links

Seth Shostak biography at the SETI Institute
SETI Institute Homepage
"Are We Alone?" Radio Show
 Should We Keep a Low Profile in Space?
 "Boldly Going Nowhere" by Seth Shostak, The New York Times (April 13, 2009)
Shostak interview (40:47) - RadioLIVE New Zealand (May 10, 2010)
 
Shostak testimony - U.S.Congress: "Using Radio in the Search for Extraterrestrial Intelligence" (May 21, 2014)

1943 births
Living people
American astronomers
American skeptics
Jewish American scientists
Astrobiologists
Search for extraterrestrial intelligence
American talk radio hosts
California Institute of Technology alumni
Princeton University alumni
Academic staff of the University of Groningen
American people of Ukrainian descent
American people of Ukrainian-Jewish descent
People from Arlington County, Virginia
Scientists from Virginia